Caterina Cybo (13 September 1501 – 17 February 1557) was an Italian ruler. She was regent of the Duchy of Camerino between 1527 and 1535 during the minority of her daughter Giulia da Varano.

References 

1501 births
1557 deaths
16th-century women rulers
16th-century Italian nobility
16th-century Italian women
Cybo family